Manoj Mudgal (born 18 October 1972) is an Indian cricketer. He played in 68 first-class and 57 List A matches for Uttar Pradesh from 1992/93 to 2001/02.

See also
 List of Uttar Pradesh cricketers

References

External links
 

1972 births
Living people
Indian cricketers
Uttar Pradesh cricketers
Sportspeople from Meerut